The Stony Awards (a.k.a. the Stonys) recognize and celebrate notable stoner films and television. The Stonys began as a feature in High Times magazine in 2000. Six High Times Stony Awards ceremonies were held in New York City beginning in 2000, before the Stonys moved to Los Angeles in 2007. Award winners received a bong-shaped trophy.

Locations and hosts
 2000 - Anthology Film Archives in New York City; hosted by Upright Citizens Brigade
 2001 - Anthology Film Archives in New York City ; hosted by Brian McCann
 2002 - March 3 at B.B. King's Blues Club & Grill in New York; hosted by Jim Breuer
 2003 - B.B. King's Blues Club & Grill; hosted by Pauly Shore
 2005 - September 28 at Spirit Nightclub; hosted by Tony Camin
 2006 - October 24 at BB King's in New York City; co-hosted by Redman and Doug Benson
 2007 - October 13 at The Knitting Factory in Hollywood; hosted by Tommy Chong
 2008 - September 27 at Malibu Inn; hosted by Vaporella
 2010 - September 30 at the Music Box; hosted by Cheech & Chong

List of winners

High Times Guide to Stoner Film History
Reefer Madness (1936);
Fantasia (1940);
Hi De Ho (1947);
High School Confidential (1958);
A Hard Day's Night (1964);
Help! (1965);
Blowup (1966);
The Trip (1967);
I Love You, Alice B. Toklas, Yellow Submarine (1968);
Easy Rider (1969);
The Harder They Come (1972);
Serpico (1973);
Shampoo (1975);
Annie Hall (1977);
Up In Smoke, Rockers (1978);
Apocalypse Now (1979);
Where the Buffalo Roam (1980);
Nice Dreams (1981);
Fast Times at Ridgemont High (1982);
Still Smokin' (1983);
Cheech & Chong's The Corsican Brothers (1984);
That Was Then... This Is Now (1985);
Platoon (1986);
Born in East L.A. (1987);
1969 (1988);
Bill & Ted's Excellent Adventure (1989);
Far Out Man (1990);
The Doors (1991);
Wayne's World (1992);
Dazed and Confused (1993);
Clerks, The Stoned Age (1994);
Friday, Mallrats (1995);
Beavis and Butt-Head Do America (1996);
Bongwater (1997);
The Big Lebowski, Half Baked (1998);
Detroit Rock City, Idle Hands, American Beauty (1999);
Dude, Where's My Car?; Next Friday, Scary Movie (2000);
Super Troopers, How High, Scary Movie 2 (2001);
Laurel Canyon (2002);
Rolling Kansas (2003);
Harold & Kumar Go to White Castle (2004);
Lords of Dogtown (2005);
Grandma's Boy; Puff, Puff, Pass (2006);
Knocked Up, Tenacious D in the Pick of Destiny (2007);
Harold & Kumar Escape from Guantanamo Bay, Pineapple Express (2008)

Thomas King Forçade Award
Named after High Times founder Tom Forçade, the award is for "stony achievement" in film.

 2002: Francis Ford Coppola for Apocalypse Now 
 2003: Frank Serpico for Serpico 
 2006: Jeff "The Dude" Dowd for The Big Lebowski

See also

 List of cannabis competitions
 List of films containing frequent marijuana use

References

External links
 High Times archive

American film awards
American television awards
American cannabis awards